Until Dawn is a 2019 reality television show web television series. The premise revolves around three comedians, Ornella Fleury, Alban Ivanov and Ahmed Sylla, who spend from midnight until dawn in a spooky place.

Cast 
 Ornella Fleury
 Alban Ivanov
 Ahmed Sylla

Release 
Until Dawn was released on January 10, 2020, on Netflix.

References

External links
 
 

2020 French television series debuts
2010s French television series
French-language Netflix original programming